Gorgonidia cubotaensis is a moth of the family Erebidae first described by Reich in 1938. It is found in Brazil.

References

Phaegopterina
Moths of South America
Moths described in 1938